Donald Douglas DuBose (born March 14, 1964) is a former American football running back who played two seasons with the San Francisco 49ers of the National Football League (NFL). He played college football at the University of Nebraska–Lincoln and attended Montville High School in Oakdale, Connecticut. DuBose was also a member of the Sacramento Surge of the World League of American Football (WLAF). He was a member of the San Francisco 49ers team that won Super Bowl XXIII.

External links
Just Sports Stats
College stats
Fanbase profile

Living people
1964 births
Players of American football from Connecticut
American football running backs
African-American players of American football
Nebraska Cornhuskers football players
San Francisco 49ers players
Sacramento Surge players
Sportspeople from New London, Connecticut
National Football League replacement players
21st-century African-American people
20th-century African-American sportspeople